Tony Lemar Jefferson Jr. (born January 27, 1992) is an American football strong safety for the New York Giants of the National Football League (NFL). He played college football at Oklahoma and signed with the Arizona Cardinals as an undrafted free agent in 2013.

High school career
Jefferson attended Eastlake High School in Chula Vista, California, where he made 88 tackles, 12 tackles for loss, four sacks, two fumbles caused, two fumbles recovered, and lead Eastlake to a San Diego Division 1 CIF championship during his senior year. He earned a 2009 USA Today All-American selection. Regarded as a four-star recruit by Rivals.com, Jefferson was listed as the No. 4 cornerback prospect in the class of 2010. He played in the 2010 U.S. Army All-American Bowl.

College career
At the University of Oklahoma, Jefferson was a 2010 Freshman All-American by College Football News, The Sporting News, and Big 12 Conference co-Defensive Freshman of the Year (along with OSU Cowboys linebacker Shaun Lewis).

College statistics

Professional career
On January 6, 2013, it was announced that Jefferson would forgo his senior season and enter the 2013 NFL Draft. Prior to the NFL Combine, Jefferson was ranked the fifth best safety prospect in the draft by ESPN. He was one of 21 safeties to attend the NFL Scouting Combine in Indianapolis, Indiana. At the combine, he completed the majority of drills before sustaining a hamstring injury that significantly affected his ability to run. His 40-yard dash was the second slowest time among all 18 safeties that participated. On March 18, 2013, Jefferson attended Oklahoma's pro day, but only performed the short shuttle and three-cone drill due to his hamstring injury. His character came into question after WalterFootball.com released a scouting report stating it received information from reliable sources that he had practice habits and an attitude, but was quickly dismissed after teammates and coaching staff at Oklahoma refuted the claims. The website later retracted the claims. He was projected to be drafted as early as the second or third round or as late as the fifth round by NFL Draft experts and scouts. Jefferson was ranked the eighth best safety in the draft by DraftScout.com and SB Nation.

Arizona Cardinals
On April 28, 2013, the Arizona Cardinals signed Jefferson to a three-year, $1.49 million contract that includes a signing bonus of $10,100 after he went undrafted in the 2013 NFL Draft. His fall in the draft surprised analysts and was attributed to his time in the 40-yard dash and questions about his work ethic.

2013
Throughout training camp, Jefferson competed for a roster spot as a backup safety against Jonathon Amaya, Curtis Taylor, Javon Harris, and Josh Hill.

On August 17, 2013, Jefferson recorded five combined tackles and intercepted two passes by Alex Tanney and Kyle Orton during a 12–7 victory against the Dallas Cowboys in their second preseason game. Head coach Bruce Arians named Jefferson the backup strong safety, behind Yeremiah Bell, to begin the regular season after he performed well in the preseason and recorded 14 combined tackles (13 solo), two interceptions, and a sack.

He made his professional regular season debut in the Arizona Cardinals' season-opening 27–24 loss at the St. Louis Rams. The following week, Jefferson earned his first career start and made three solo tackles during a 25–22 victory against the Detroit Lions in Week 2. He made his first career tackle on running back Reggie Bush, stopping him for a four-yard loss in the first quarter. On September 29, 2013, Jefferson collected a season-high seven combined tackles during 13–10 victory at the Tampa Bay Buccaneers. His snaps increased for the last three games of the season (Weeks 15–17) after Tyrann Mathieu tore two ligaments in his knee and was sidelined for the rest of the season. In Week 16, he earned his second career start, replacing free safety Rashad Johnson, who was inactive due to an injury he suffered the previous week. Jefferson finished the Cardinals' 17–10 victory at the Seattle Seahawks with four combined tackles.

2014
During OTA's and training camp, Jefferson competed against Rashad Johnson and rookie first round pick Deone Bucannon for the job as the starting strong safety. Defensive coordinator Todd Bowles named Jefferson the starting strong safety to start the regular season, alongside free safety Tyrann Mathieu. Rashad Johnson later replaced Mathieu as the starting free safety to start the season due to a slow recovery process for Mathieu's knee injury.

In Week 3, Jefferson made ten combined tackles (eight solo) and his first career sack on quarterback Colin Kaepernick during a 23–14 victory against the San Francisco 49ers. On October 26, 2014, he collected a season-high 12 combined tackles (11 solo) and broke up a pass in the Cardinals' 24–20 victory against the Philadelphia Eagles. Jefferson was replaced as the starting free safety prior to Week 10, after Tyrann Mathieu fully recovered from his knee injury. He remained the backup free safety for four games (Weeks 10–13). In Week 13, Mathieu sustained a broken thumb during a 29–18 loss at the Atlanta Falcons. Jefferson filled in at starting free safety for three games (Weeks 14–16) while Mathieu recovered from surgery to repair his broken thumb. On December 26, 2014, Jefferson recorded seven solo tackles as the Cardinals were routed 35–6 by the Seattle Seahawks in Week 16. Jefferson finished the  season with 79 combined tackles (70 solo), a pass deflection, and a sack in 16 games and eight starts. Jefferson, Johnson, Mathieu, and Bucannon all shared time and rotated at both safety positions throughout 2014. Jefferson and Johnson were called upon to play in the Cardinals' base formations and received the majority of the snaps, while Bucannon was given duties that required the safety to play in the box. Mathieu was the designated safety for nickel packages. All four safeties were on the field for 70 defensive snaps.

The Arizona Cardinals finished second in the NFC West with an 11–5 record. On January 3, 2015, Jefferson started in his first career playoff game and made up seven combined tackles in the Cardinals' 27–16 loss to the Carolina Panthers in the NFC Wildcard Game.

2015
Jefferson returned to training camp competing for the job as the starting strong safety against Deone Bucannon . Defensive coordinator James Bettcher named Jefferson the starting strong safety to start the 2015 season, opposite free safety Tyrann Mathieu.

On September 20, 2015, Jefferson recorded nine solo tackles, a pass deflection, and returned his first career interception off a pass by quarterback Jay Cutler for a 26-yard touchdown during a 48–23 victory at the Chicago Bears in Week 2. His interception came off a pass attended for Martellus Bennett in the second quarter and also marked his first career touchdown. In Week 5, he collected a season-high 12 combined tackles (eight solo), a pass deflection, and forced two fumbles in a 42–16 victory at the Detroit Lions. On November 29, 2015, Jefferson made six combined tackles and a sack on Blaine Gabbert during the Cardinals' 19–13 victory at the San Francisco 49ers. Jefferson finished his third season with 78 combined tackles (58 solo), five pass deflections, three forced fumbles, two sacks, two interceptions, and a touchdown in 16 games and seven starts. His 78 tackles were the fourth most on the team. Pro Football Focus gave Jefferson an overall grade of 81.3, ranking him 18th among all qualifying safeties in 2015.

The Arizona Cardinals finished first in the NFC West with a 13–3 record and received a first round bye. The Cardinals defeated the Green Bay Packers 26–20 in the NFC Divisional Round. On January 24, 2016, Jefferson started for the Cardinals in the NFC Championship and recorded 11 combined tackles (five solo) and a pass deflection in their 49–15 loss to the Carolina Panthers.

2016
On April 18, 2016, the Arizona Cardinals signed Jefferson to a one-year, $1.67 million tender with a right of first refusal clause.

Throughout training camp, he competed for the job as the starting strong safety against D.J. Swearinger. Head coach Bruce Arians named Jefferson the backup strong safety behind D.J. Swearinger to begin the regular season.

He started the Arizona Cardinals' season-opener against the New England Patriots and recorded ten combined tackles (nine solo) in their 23–21 loss. The following week, he collected a season-high 11 combined tackles (nine solo) in the Cardinals' 40–7 victory over the Tampa Bay Buccaneers in Week 2. On December 11, 2016, Jefferson recorded ten combined tackles (seven solo) during a 26–23 loss at the Miami Dolphins. In Week 16, he made seven solo tackles before exiting the Cardinals' 35–6 loss to the Seattle Seahawks in the second quarter after he sustained a knee injury while covering a punt. He was diagnosed with a sprained MCL and was placed on injured reserve on December 27, 2016. He finished his last season as part of the Cardinals with a career-high 96 combined tackles (78 solo), five pass deflections, two sacks, two fumble recoveries, and two forced fumbles in 15 games and 14 starts.

The Arizona Cardinals did not qualify for the playoffs in 2016 after finishing second in the NFC West with a 7–8–1 record. Pro Football Focus gave Jefferson an overall grade of 88.6, ranking him fifth among all qualifying safeties in 2016.

Baltimore Ravens
Jefferson became an unrestricted free agent after the 2016 season and was regarded as the second best free agent safety on the market behind Kansas City Chiefs' safety Eric Berry. He received interest from multiple teams including the Chicago Bears. It was reported that Jefferson received offers from the Cleveland Browns and New York Jets.

On March 9, 2017, the Baltimore Ravens signed Jefferson to a four-year, $34 million contract that includes $19 million guaranteed and a signing bonus of $10 million.

2017
He entered training camp slated as the starting strong safety, replacing Lardarius Webb. Head coach John Harbaugh officially named him the starter to open the season, alongside free safety Eric Weddle. Jefferson started the Baltimore Ravens' season-opener against the Cincinnati Bengals and recorded nine combined tackles and a sack on quarterback Andy Dalton during their 20–0 victory. In Week 12, he recorded three combined tackles, deflected a pass, and intercepted a pass by Tom Savage in the Ravens' 23–16 victory against the Houston Texans. On December 10, 2017, Jefferson made a season-high 11 combined tackles (eight solo) and was credited with half a sack during a 39–38 loss at the Pittsburgh Steelers. Jefferson and teammate Terrell Suggs sacked Roethlisberger for a nine-yard loss the fourth quarter. He finished his first season with the Baltimore Ravens with 79 combined tackles (56 solo), 2.5 sacks, two pass deflections, and an interception in 16 games and 16 starts. Pro Football Focus gave Jefferson an overall grade of 82.4, which ranked 24th among all qualifying safeties in 2017.

2018
Jefferson returned as the Ravens starting strong safety in 2018. He started 14 games, recording 74 combined tackles, a forced fumble, an interception, and a career-high six pass deflections.

2019
On October 6, 2019, in a game against the Steelers, Jefferson was in coverage when he fell to the ground, grabbing his knee. It was revealed after the game that he tore his ACL ultimately, ending his season. The Ravens did go on to win the game 26–23 in OT. The following day, Jefferson was put on season-ending injured reserve.

On February 14, 2020, Jefferson was released by the Ravens.

San Francisco 49ers
After spending the 2020 season out of football, Jefferson was signed a one-year, $1 million contract with the San Francisco 49ers on June 7, 2021. However, he was placed on injured reserve on August 12, 2021, and later released on August 23, 2021. He was re-signed to the practice squad on October 25, 2021. He was released on December 8, 2021, after appearing in two games.

Baltimore Ravens (second stint)
On December 13, 2021, Jefferson was re-signed to the Baltimore Ravens practice squad. On January 8,  2022, Jefferson was promoted to the active roster.

On February 24, 2022, Jefferson re-signed with the Ravens.

On August 30, 2022, Jefferson was released by the Ravens.

New York Giants
On September 1, 2022, Jefferson signed with the New York Giants practice squad. Jefferson was elevated from the practice squad for Week 1 and Week 2 games against the Tennessee Titans and Carolina Panthers. On October 8, 2022, he was promoted to the active roster.

On October 15, 2022, he was placed on injured reserve with a foot injury. On December 3, Jefferson was activated from injured reserve.

NFL career statistics

References

External links
 Sports-Reference (college), NFL.com
Oklahoma Sooners bio
Arizona Cardinals bio

1992 births
Living people
Sportspeople from Chula Vista, California
Players of American football from California
American football safeties
Oklahoma Sooners football players
Arizona Cardinals players
Baltimore Ravens players
San Francisco 49ers players
New York Giants players